Nutfield Marshes is a   nature reserve near Nutfield in Surrey. It is managed by the Surrey Wildlife Trust.

These former sand quarries along the Redhill Brook are now wetland nature reserves called The Moors, Spynes Mere, and Holmethorpe Lagoons. They provide habitats for many birds, with 144 species recorded in Holmethorp Lagoon. Spynes Mere has three lakes.

There is public access to the site apart from The Moors.

References

Surrey Wildlife Trust